The city now known as Ho Chi Minh City has gone by several different names during its history, reflecting settlement by different ethnic, cultural and political groups. Originally known as Prey Nôkôr while a part of the Khmer Empire, it came to be dubbed Sài Gòn informally by Vietnamese settlers fleeing the Trịnh–Nguyễn War to the north. In time, control of the city and the area passed to the Vietnamese, who gave the city the name of Gia Định. This name remained until the time of French conquest in the 1860s, when the occupying force adopted the name Saïgon for the city, a westernized form of the traditional Vietnamese name. The current name was given after the Fall of Saigon in 1975, and honors Hồ Chí Minh, the first leader of North Vietnam. Even today, however, the informal name of Sài Gòn remains in daily speech both domestically and internationally, especially among the Vietnamese diaspora and local southern Vietnamese.

Khmer name 
The area where present-day Ho Chi Minh City is located was likely inhabited long since prehistory; the empire of Funan (although it is still debated whether Funan is a Khmer state) and later Chenla maintained a presence in the Mekong Delta for centuries. The city was known as Prey Nôkôr to the Khmer Empire, which likely maintained a settlement centuries before its rise in the 11th and 12th centuries. The most popular interpretation of the name, and one supported by former Cambodian King Norodom Sihanouk, suggests that the name means "forest city" or "forest kingdom"—prey meaning forest or jungle, and nôkôr being a Khmer word of Sanskrit origin meaning city or kingdom. The name Krŭng Prey Nôkôr ("Prey Nôkôr City") is currently used to refer to Ho Chi Minh City in the Khmer language.

Vietnamese names

Sài Gòn 

Beginning in the 1620s, Prey Nôkôr was gradually settled by Vietnamese refugees fleeing the Trịnh–Nguyễn War further to the north. In 1623, Khmer king Chey Chettha II (1618–1628) allowed the Vietnamese to settle in the area, which they colloquially referred to as Sài Gòn, and to set up a custom house at Prey Nôkôr. The increasing waves of Vietnamese settlers which followed overwhelmed the Khmer kingdom—weakened as it was due to war with Thailand—and slowly Vietnamized the area. Upon capturing the city during the Cochinchina Campaign in 1859, the French officially westernized the city's traditional name into "Saigon".

Since the time of original Vietnamese settlement, the informal name of Sài Gòn has remained in daily speech; apart from official matters, it is still the most common way to refer to the city inside Vietnam, despite an official name change after the end of the Vietnam War in 1975. Sài Gòn is still used to refer to the central district, District 1. Sài Gòn Railway Station in District 3, the main railway station serving the city, retains the name, as well as the city's zoo. The name is also found in company names, book titles and even on airport departure boards: the IATA code for Tân Sơn Nhất International Airport is SGN.

There is much debate about the origins of the name, the etymology of which is analyzed below. The Vietnamese most often write the name as Sài Gòn, in two words, following the traditional convention in Vietnamese spelling. Some, however, exceptionally write the name of the city as "SaiGon" or "Saigon" in order to save space or give the name a more Westernized look.

In addition, both the names Saigon and Ho Chi Minh City appear within the official seal of the city.

Etymology 

Sino-Vietnamese etymology
A frequently heard, and reasonable, explanation is that Sài is a Chinese loanword (pronounced chái in Mandarin) meaning "firewood, lops, twigs; palisade", while Gòn is another Chinese loanword (Chinese: 棍, pronounced gùn in Mandarin) meaning "stick, pole, bole", and whose meaning evolved into "cotton" in Vietnamese (bông gòn, literally "cotton stick", i.e., "cotton plant", then shortened to gòn).

This name may have originated from the many cotton (kapok) plants that the Khmer people had planted around Prey Nôkôr, and which can still be seen at Cây Mai temple and surrounding areas.

Another explanation is that the etymological meaning "twigs" (sài) and "boles" (gòn) refers to the dense and tall forest that once existed around the city, a forest to which the Khmer name, Prey Nokor, already referred.

In Chinese, the city is referred to as 西貢 (a transcription of the Vietnamese name), pronounced Sāigung in Cantonese, Sai-kòng in Teochew and Xīgòng in Mandarin.

Cantonese etymology
Another reasonable etymology was offered by Vương Hồng Sển, a Vietnamese scholar in the early 20th century, who asserted that Sài Gòn had its origin in the Cantonese name of Cholon (Vietnamese: quoc ngu Chợ Lớn; chữ nôm), the Chinese district of Saigon. The Cantonese (and original) name of Cholon is "Tai-Ngon" (堤岸), which means "embankment" (French: quais). The theory posits that "Sài Gòn" derives from "Tai-Ngon".

Thai etymology
According to Lê Van Phát, a Vietnamese military officer, a similar source for the name may have developed from the Thai words Cai-ngon, meaning "cotton bush" or "cotton plant". Lê stated that Laotians refer to Saigon as "Cai-ngon".

Khmer etymology
Another etymology often proposed, although held now as a least-likely etymology, is that "Saigon" comes from "Sai Côn", which would be the transliteration of the Khmer word, Prey Nôkôr, meaning "forest city" or "forest kingdom", or Prey Kôr, meaning "forest of kapok trees".

This Khmer etymology theory is quite interesting, given the Khmer context that existed when the first Vietnamese settlers arrived in the region. However, it fails to completely explain how Khmer "prey" led to Vietnamese "sài", since these two syllables appear phonetically quite distinct and as the least reasonable and least likely candidate from the Khmer etymology.

Cham etymology
The Khmer etymology is considered to be the least likely candidate above because of the complex onset of "Prey" as opposed to the simple onset of "Sài". Furthermore, there is voice distinction between the onsets of "kôr" and "gòn", not to mention syllabic syncope of the [no] in "Nôkôr" without the accompanying tone rise as normally occurs during monosyllabification in Southeast Asian tone languages (Thurgood, 1992; Thurgood and Li, 2002). However, if the word passed directly from Cham into Vietnamese without a Khmer intermediary stage, the complex onset, apocope and voice distinctions would be eliminated. Furthermore, the [au]~[o] alternation is well established in Vietnamese, and is still active today. For example, "không" as [χomɰ] or [χawmɰ] meaning "no" is not dialectal according to region, but is used in free variation throughout present day Ho Chi Minh City (Lopez, 2010). Therefore, the historical chronology given by Nghia M. Vo is corroborated by linguistic evidence as NPD (Normal Phonological Development) would lead to the Cham name of Bai Gaur being adopted into Vietnamese as "Sài Gòn". The nasalization of coda sonorants such as [r] to [n] is well established in Vietnamese, and serves as a strong indication of Vietnamese "Sài Gòn" and Khmer "Prey Nôkôr" as doublets of a Cham original. Analogy usually postdates the etymological source, such as in the morphism of "Gaur" into "Nôkôr" by analogy with the Sanskrit "Nagara" as well as in the imaginative but highly speculatory attributions given above alleging Sinitic etymologies in a Southeast Asian context. Further ethnolinguistic and historical linguistic studies on this subject are currently underway. (Lopez, 2011)

Gia Định 
The name of Prey Nôkôr, along with Cambodia's rule over the area, remained until the 1690s, when Nguyễn Hữu Cảnh, a Vietnamese noble, was sent by the Nguyen rulers of Huế to establish Vietnamese administrative structures in the Mekong Delta and its surroundings. This act formally detached the area from Cambodia, which found itself too weak to intervene due to its ongoing conflict with Thailand. Prey Nôkôr was officially renamed Gia Định (chữ nôm: 嘉定), and the region was placed firmly under Vietnamese administrative control. With the city's capture by the French in 1859, the name Gia Định was discarded and replaced by the name "Saigon", which had always been the popular name. Most sinitic maps were not updated to use the newer name until at least 1891, with the name of the city written as 嘉定 until then.

Etymology 
The origin of the name Gia Định has not been firmly established. One possible etymology may relate to the Chinese characters used to spell the name in Chữ Nôm: 嘉, which means "joyful", "auspicious", or "pretty", and 定, which means "decide" or "pacify". Another possible etymology, based on the fact that Malay speakers existed in the region during the era of Vietnamese settlement, relates the name to the Malay words ya dingin or ya hering, meaning "cool and cold" or "cold and clear", respectively—perhaps referring to the appearance of the area's many waterways.

Thành phố Hồ Chí Minh 
On August 27, 1946, Viet Minh's official newspaper Cứu Quốc (National Salvation) published the article Thành Phố SÀI-GÒN Từ Nay Sẽ Đổi Tên là thành phố HỒ-CHÍ-MINH (Saigon City is Now Renamed Ho Chi Minh City). This was the first time that proclaiming the city to be renamed after Hồ Chí Minh, the first leader of North Vietnam.

On July 2, 1976, upon the formal establishment of the modern-day Socialist Republic of Vietnam, the new government eventually renamed the city.

The official name is now Thành phố Hồ Chí Minh; Thành phố is the Vietnamese word for "city". In English, this is translated as Ho Chi Minh City; in French it is translated as Hô-Chi-Minh-Ville (the circumflex and hyphens are sometimes omitted). Due to its length, the name is often abbreviated or made into an acronym; "Tp. HCM" and the acronym "TPHCM" are used interchangeably in the original Vietnamese, along with "HCM City" or "HCMC" in English and "HCMV" in French.

Etymology 
As noted, the now-official name commemorates North Vietnamese leader Hồ Chí Minh, who, although deceased by the time of the Fall of Saigon, was instrumental in the establishment of the Socialist Republic of Vietnam. "Hồ Chí Minh" was not his original name; he was born as Nguyễn Sinh Cung, and only began using the new name around 1940. This name, which he favoured throughout his later years, combines a common Vietnamese surname (Hồ, 胡) with a given name meaning "enlightened will" (from Sino-Vietnamese 志明; Chí meaning 'will' (or spirit), and Minh meaning 'light'), in essence, meaning "bringer of light".

Other names 
The kingdom of Champa, though mainly based along the coast of the South China Sea, is known to have expanded west into the Mekong Delta. The Chams gave the city the name "Baigaur" (or "Bai Gaur"), which author Jacques Népote suggests may have been a simple adaptation of the Khmer name Prey Kôr; conversely, author Nghia M. Vo implies that a Cham presence existed in the area prior to Khmer occupation, and that the name Baigaur was given to the village that would later come to be known as Prey Nokor.

Controversy

Khmer nationalism 
The area now known as Ho Chi Minh City was part of several historical empires connected to modern-day Cambodia, including Funan, Chenla and the Khmer Empire. Formal settlements by the Khmers likely date back to the 11th century. In comparison, the first Vietnamese presence in the area dates back to the late 15th century. The gradual encroachment of the Vietnamese onto what were once Khmer lands, culminating in the creation of the unified State of Vietnam in 1949 and the associated cession of Cochinchina (known to the Khmers as Kampuchea Krom, or "Lower Cambodia") to Vietnam has resulted in significant bitterness directed towards the Vietnamese on the part of the Khmers. As a result, many of those who consider themselves Khmer nationalists would refer to Ho Chi Minh City as Prey Nôkôr, a reference to its former status as a Khmer port city.

Overseas Vietnamese 
Of the about 3 million Overseas Vietnamese, a majority left Vietnam as political refugees after 1975 as a result of the Fall of Saigon and the resulting takeover by the Communist regime, taking up residence in North America, Western Europe, and Australia. The majority are opposed to the existing government of Vietnam, and, in many cases, view Hồ Chí Minh as a dictator who ruined Vietnam by starting the war with the South Vietnam. As a result, they generally do not recognize the name Hồ Chí Minh City, and will only refer to the city as Sài Gòn, the previous official name of the city.

See also 
 Ho Chi Minh City
 Names of Asian cities in different languages
 Little Saigon

Notes and references 
Notes

References

History of Ho Chi Minh City
History of Vietnam
Ho Chi Minh City
Ho Chi Minh City